General's Son III, also known as Son of a General III, is a 1992 South Korean crime film directed by Im Kwon-taek. The third film in the General's Son trilogy, and a sequel to the 1991 film General's Son II, it stars Park Sang-min, reprising his role as gangster and later politician Kim Du-han.

Cast
 Park Sang-min as Kim Du-han
 Oh Yeon-soo as Jang Eun-shil
 Lee Il-jae
 Shin Hyun-joon
 Kim Seung-woo

References

External links
 
 Janggunui Adeul III at the Complete Index to World Film

1992 films
1990s action films
1990s crime drama films
South Korean crime action films
South Korean crime drama films
South Korean neo-noir films
Films about organized crime in Korea
Films directed by Im Kwon-taek
1990s Korean-language films
South Korean sequel films
Films set in Korea under Japanese rule
1991 drama films
1991 films
1992 drama films
South Korean films based on actual events